Concordia Stadium is a football stadium in Chiajna, Romania. The stadium holds 5,123 people.
It is the home ground of Concordia Chiajna. It hosted three group games, one semifinal and the final of the 2011 UEFA European Under-19 Football Championship.

References

Gallery

External links
Concordia Stadium at Soccerway.com

 

Chiajna
Football venues in Romania
Buildings and structures in Ilfov County